Click It or Ticket is a National Highway Traffic Safety Administration campaign aimed at increasing the use of seat belts among young people in the United States.  The campaign relies heavily on targeted advertising aimed at teens and young adults.

The Click It or Ticket campaign has existed at state level for many years. In 1993, Governor Jim Hunt launched the campaign in North Carolina in conjunction with a "primary enforcement safety belt law", which allows law enforcement officers to issue a safety belt citation, without observing another offense.  Since then, other states have adopted the campaign. In May 2002, the ten states with the most comprehensive campaigns saw an increase of 8.6 percentage points, from 68.5% to 77.1%, in safety belt usage over a four-week period (Solomon, Ulmer, & Preusser, 2002).  Recently, Congress approved $30 million in television and radio advertising at both the national and state levels.

History

Before 1980, usage of seat belts in the United States lingered around 11% despite volunteer and educational campaigns at local, county, and state levels.  Between 1980 and 1984, individual organizations, public education programs, incentives and policy changes strove to increase the use of seat belts.  However, these efforts failed to significantly affect usage in large, metropolitan areas, and by the end of the effort national seat belt usage had reached only 15%.

In 1984, New York became the first state to enact a mandatory seat belt use law, and by 1990 37 other states had followed suit. The vast majority of these laws were "secondary safety belt laws", meaning that an officer had to observe another traffic violation before issuing a citation for a seat belt infraction.  Despite this, the national usage rate climbed from 15% to 50%.

Campaign methods

The national television ad [airing] on several major networks features people driving in several regions of the country without their safety belts on. They receive a ticket, and then buckle up. The ads [appear] primarily in programs that deliver large audiences of teens and young adults—especially men. The programs include Fear Factor, WWE Smackdown, Major League Baseball, NBA Conference Finals, NASCAR Live, and the Indy 500.

The campaign is also stressing strict enforcement of safety belt laws, in particular, the "Primary safety belt laws", which allow law enforcement officers issue a safety belt citation without observing another offense.  By January 2007 25 states had primary safety belt laws, and on average 88% of people in these states use safety belts as opposed to 79% nationally.    New Hampshire, the state with historically the lowest safety belt usage, is the only state without an adult safety belt law.  Massachusetts, the state with the second lowest usage, has only a secondary safety belt law, which requires officers to observe another driving offense before issuing a safety belt citation.  Enforcement of safety belt laws of both types is to be made possible by checkpoints and saturation patrols that will detect violations of safety belt and child passenger safety laws.

Success

The campaign is deemed a success by proponents in terms of increasing seat belt use.  A survey conducted by Public Opinion Strategies found that 83% of 800 United States citizens surveyed had seen, read, or heard about the Click It or Ticket campaign.  

Figures released by the U.S. Department of Transportation after amplifying the advertising and enforcement campaign on May 19, 2003 indicated that "National belt use among young men and women ages 16-24 moved from 65% to 72%, and 73% to 80% respectively, while belt use in the overall population increased from 75% to 79%."

Opposition

Opposition to the effort is primarily based on the belief that requiring wearing of a seatbelt is a violation of civil rights. For example, Prof. Walter E. Williams of George Mason University writes, "The point is whether government has a right to coerce us into taking care of ourselves. If eating what we wish is our business and not that of government, then why should we accept government's coercing us to wear seat belts?" Journalist Scott Indrisek has strenuously worked to oppose mandatory seat belt efforts, which he calls "a black stain on America."
Additional objections settle specifically around the assertion that a seatbelt is a medical device, and because one is entitled to make their own medical decisions they should also be permitted to make their own decisions about wearing a seatbelt.

Two Internet-based groups were founded to advocate this line of thinking. Stick It to Click It or Ticket operated a website and discussion forum, as did The Coalition for Seatbelt Choice. Both groups provided various levels of assistance to citation recipients by encouraging them to take their tickets to court. The groups have sponsored letter-writing campaigns to the editors of newspapers against compulsory seatbelt statutes. Both sites have since disappeared.

In Maryland, former Governor Robert Ehrlich opposed spotlights used by police officers to see into vehicles at night to determine if seat belts were being used on the basis that this violated privacy. Nighttime enforcement was suspended at the governor's request. Nighttime enforcement was resumed by Ehrlich's successor, Martin O'Malley, hours after O'Malley took office in January 2007.

During the COVID-19 pandemic after seeing facemask orders/mandates have been being compared to seat belt laws, many states in 2021 have tried to repeal their seat belt laws.

See also
 Clunk Click Every Trip
 Seat belt legislation
 Seat belt legislation in the United States

References

External links

 Official campaign site (NHTSA.gov)
 TrafficSafetyMarketing.gov (contains official campaign materials)
 Click It or Ticket set to launch amid strong support
 Click It or Ticket
 Walter Williams on Click It or Ticket
 Social Marketing
 Seat Belt Laws for all 50 states and links to State's websites

Automotive safety
Public awareness campaigns
Hazardous motor vehicle activities
Public service announcements of the United States
American political catchphrases
American advertising slogans
1993 neologisms
Seat belts
Road signs in the United States